Popovskaya is a rural locality (a village) in Tolshmenskoye Rural Settlement, Totemsky  District, Vologda Oblast, Russia. The population was 6 as of 2002.

Geography 
Popovskaya is located 99 km south of Totma (the district's administrative centre) by road. Uspenye is the nearest rural locality.

References 

Rural localities in Totemsky District